Ulrich Vite (born 8 February 1944) is a German equestrian. He competed in two events at the 1968 Summer Olympics.

References

1944 births
Living people
German male equestrians
Olympic equestrians of East Germany
Equestrians at the 1968 Summer Olympics
Sportspeople from Wrocław